The following is a list of the Teen Choice Award winners and nominees for Choice Movie – Drama. Formerly, it had been combined with Choice Action Movie as the Choice Movie – Action/Drama award.

Winners and nominees

1990s

2000s

 - Year awarded was under Choice Movie – Action/Drama.

2010s

References

Drama